Sharon Lynn Wichman (born May 13, 1952), also known her married name Sharon Jones, is an American former competition swimmer and Olympic champion.

She represented the United States as a 16-year-old at the 1968 Summer Olympics in Mexico City, having qualified to compete in both breaststroke events.  Wichman received a gold medal for winning the women's 200-meter breaststroke (2:44.4), beating Đurđica Bjedov of Yugoslavia by two seconds.  She also received a bronze medal for her third place in the women's 100-meter breaststroke (1:16.1), finishing behind Bjedov (1:15.8) and Soviet swimmer Galina Prozumenshchikova (1:15.9).

Wichman was born in Detroit, Michigan, and graduated in 1970 from R. Nelson Snider High School in Fort Wayne, Indiana.  She married David Jones in 1973, and lives in nearby Churubusco, Indiana.  She has two sons.

She was inducted into the International Swimming Hall of Fame as an "Honor Swimmer" in 1991.

See also
 List of members of the International Swimming Hall of Fame
 List of Olympic medalists in swimming (women)

References

External links
 

1952 births
Living people
American female breaststroke swimmers
Medalists at the 1968 Summer Olympics
Olympic bronze medalists for the United States in swimming
Olympic gold medalists for the United States in swimming
Swimmers from Detroit
Sportspeople from Fort Wayne, Indiana
Swimmers at the 1968 Summer Olympics
21st-century American women